The German so called  or SWK (English: Keyword catalog) is a library catalog, which lists the publications according to descriptor keywords and thus allows selective thematic searches for literature. A keyword is understood to be a natural language expression that reproduces the content of the publication as briefly but precisely as possible. Complex content can be described using a syntactical keyword chain, a combination of several individual keywords (example: Uganda / child / soldier / experience report). The sub-keywords are not only used for targeted research, but also allow the catalog user to see whether the document found is relevant to him. While earlier keyword catalogs were kept as an independent card catalog, the search option for keywords is integrated in modern OPACs.

Rules for keyword cataloging 
The  (English: Rules for subject headings cataloging) (RSWK), up to the third edition in 2016 still called  (English: Rules for the subject headings catalog), are used in universal academic libraries and public libraries, and with restrictions also in special libraries in Germany, Austria, and in German-speaking parts of Switzerland and Italy (South Tyrol) for verbal subject cataloguing of bibliographical contents.

See also 
 Documentation
 Subject indexing (keywording)
 Authority file
 Systematics
 MAB-SWD

References

Further reading 
 
 

Metadata
Library cataloging and classification
Library catalogues